René Renno (born 19 February 1979) is a German former professional footballer who played as a goalkeeper.

Career statistics

References

External links
 
 

1979 births
Living people
Footballers from Berlin
German footballers
Association football goalkeepers
Bundesliga players
2. Bundesliga players
Hertha BSC II players
Tennis Borussia Berlin players
SG Wattenscheid 09 players
Rot-Weiss Essen players
VfL Bochum players
VfL Bochum II players
FC Energie Cottbus players
FC Energie Cottbus II players
3. Liga players